The Madejski Stadium (currently known as the Select Car Leasing Stadium for sponsorship reasons) is a football stadium in Reading. It is the home of Reading Football Club, who play in the EFL Championship. It also provides the finish for the Reading Half Marathon. It is an all-seater bowl stadium with a capacity of 24,161 and is located close to the M4 motorway. The West Stand contains the voco Reading Hotel, formerly known as the Millennium Madejski Hotel.

The stadium was opened on 22 August 1998 and replaced Elm Park as Reading's home ground.

History
In January 1990, the Taylor Report made all-seater stadiums compulsory in the top two divisions of English football for the 1994-95 season. Having played in the second tier of the English league several times before, Reading were champions of Division Two in 1994, and were promoted to Division One. Reading became subject to the Taylor requirements. Converting Elm Park to an all-seater stadium was not practical, so a location in Smallmead (to the south of the town) was identified as the site for a new stadium. The location of a closed landfill, the site was purchased for £1, on the condition that the team develop the A33 relief road. Construction of the new stadium, which was undertaken by Birse Group, was underway by 1997, and the last competitive match at Elm Park took place on 3 May 1998 against Norwich City, with Reading losing 1–0, having already been relegated to Division Two.

Reading began the 1998–99 season at the Madejski Stadium. It was opened on 22 August 1998 when Luton Town were beaten 3–0 with Grant Brebner having the honour of scoring the first ever goal at the stadium. Plans for the stadium had first been unveiled some three years previously, when chairman John Madejski had decided that Elm Park was unsuitable for redevelopment as an all-seater stadium and that relocation to a new site was necessary. Following the death of academy manager Eamonn Dolan in 2016, Reading announced that the North Stand would now be renamed The Eamonn Dolan Stand.

In July 2021, at the beginning of the 150th anniversary season, it was announced that the Madejski Stadium had been rebranded as the Select Car Leasing Stadium for the next ten years. In honour of Sir John Madejski,  the East Stand was renamed as The Sir John Madejski Stand.

Structure and facilities

The stadium cost more than £50m to build and the pitch incorporates a system of synthetic fibres interwoven with natural grass, installed at a cost of more than £750,000. It is built on the site of a former household waste dump and is surrounded by methane vents.

The Eamonn Dolan Stand capacity is said to be 4,946 including 25 spaces for wheelchairs. Although in use for all Reading matches, the stand was normally closed for London Irish and only opened in exceptional circumstances where demand required.

The South Stand has a capacity of 4,350 including 29 wheelchair spaces and is where visiting supporters sit for Reading games. The initial allocation visiting teams receive is 2,327 and is the half of the stand joining onto the West Stand.The other half of the South Stand is Club 1871, a home fans member area, which encourages safe standing to create a matchday atmosphere. Under the terms of their original lease, London Irish only utilised the South Stand for the most popular matches. However, with the original renegotiation and extension of the lease, the South Stand was used for all London Irish matches with an unreserved seating plan. London Irish sold season tickets for South Stand between 2008 and 2014-15. Since 2015, with falling attendance at London Irish, the South Stand remained closed for rugby and only opened if required.

The Sir John Madejski Stand has a capacity of 7,286 including 18 spaces for wheelchairs. The stand also contains the stadium's video screen which is located in the corner adjoining the South Stand. The stand was open for all London Irish fixtures only until the end of the 2015–16 season and again for the 2017-18 season and 2019-20 seasons.

The West Stand, the stadium's main stand, has a capacity of 7,579 including 15 wheelchair spaces and contains a lower and an upper tier. The upper level does not overhang the lower tier and the executive boxes are located between the two tiers.  The tunnel and dugouts are located in this stand. During the 2016-17 and 2018-19 seasons, the West Stand was the only stand in regular use for London Irish home games. The outside of the stand contains the voco Reading hotel, a member of InterContinental Hotels Group's voco chain.

Future
For the first time in its history, Reading Football Club participated in the Premier League in the 2006–07 season. As a result of the sell-out crowds for their first few fixtures of the season, the club announced its intention, in October 2006, to make a planning application to extend the ground to between 37,000 and 38,000 seats. The application was made on 24 January 2007, proposing initially the extension of the East Stand with a further 6,000 seats (raising capacity to around 30,000) and subsequently extension of the North and South Stands to reach the full proposed capacity.

On 24 May 2007, it was announced that planning permission had been granted to extend the stadium to a capacity of 36,900. The first phase will expand the East Stand by 6,600 seats. Work was set to start in mid-2008, after the initial plan of extending in 2007 was scrapped due to spectator seats being affected, during the work, already being sold to season ticket holders.

Reading's relegation from the Premier League in 2008 meant that all expansion plans were put on hold, but were revived when promotion was again achieved in 2012.

Plans to expand the ground were again put on hold after Reading were relegated back to the Football League Championship at the end of the 2012–13 season after a goalless draw at home to QPR on 28 April 2013.

International football
The stadium has hosted five England under-21 internationals. These were as follows.

An England B match was also held at the stadium.

Other international matches.

Rugby union

Although a designated football stadium, the stadium was used regularly since opening for rugby union. Richmond were the first rugby team to become Reading's tenants, using the stadium from its opening season in 1998 after outgrowing their original home of Richmond Athletic Ground. This tenancy lasted only one season as Richmond went into administration and were nominally merged into London Irish.

London Irish moved into the stadium in 2000 after a year of ground sharing at the Stoop Memorial Ground in Twickenham. On 11 January 2008, it was announced that London Irish had reached an agreement to continue playing home games at the stadium until 2026. However, they were to leave after the 2019–20 season. London Irish played their last game at the stadium on 1 March 2020 when they were defeated by Wasps. The COVID-19 pandemic had disrupted the season causing a premature end to their tenancy.

Irish saw their average crowds grow to more than 11,100 after moving to Reading in 2000, holding the record for the biggest rugby union Premiership attendance at a club ground, when 23,709 people saw Irish play London Wasps on 16 March 2008. This record stood until 19 Sep 2009, when Leicester Tigers opened their new stand to increase capacity to 24,000.

In addition to London Irish home matches, the stadium has also hosted several knock out phases of European cup rugby where a neutral ground was required or where teams were required to play at a larger capacity ground.

Music
Besides football, the Madejski Stadium can be configured to hold other events, including concerts. 
On 3 July 2006, the Red Hot Chili Peppers played the Madejski Stadium as part of their Stadium Arcadium World Tour.

Other uses
The Madejski was selected as the venue for a charity friendly football match on 3 May 2006, featuring celebrities and football legends from England and Germany. The Match, named England vs Germany: The Legends was held to raise money for the Bobby Moore Fund and the British Red Cross and to celebrate the fortieth anniversary of England winning the 1966 World Cup. The German team won the match 4–2, in an exact reversal of the score from 1966, in front of a crowd of 20,000.

The stadium is also the final venue for the Reading Senior Cup.

Runners finishing the Reading Half Marathon cross the finish line inside the stadium. The stadium is also used as a hub for pre- and post-event services e.g. public transport terminus and bag drop during the day of the event.

A match from the 2000 Rugby League World Cup was also held here.

From February 2021 onwards, the stadium was used by the NHS as a mass vaccination centre as part of the nationwide vaccine rollout, at the height of the COVID-19 pandemic.

Records
The highest attendance at the stadium was 24,184 (apparently exceeding the stadium's stated capacity) on 17 November 2012 for the Premier League game with Everton beating the previous record of 24,160 set on 16 September 2012 for the Premier League game with Tottenham Hotspur. The highest attendance for a cup match at the stadium was 24,107 on 3 December 2003 for the Football League Cup match with Chelsea.

Highest attendances

Attendances by season

Notes

Transport
On Reading match days, the stadium is served by a network of special bus services provided by Reading Buses and Stagecoach Buses. Two of these (Reading Buses F1 and F2) provide regular shuttle services from Reading railway station and from a park and ride site at Shinfield Park respectively. Fourteen further Reading Bus services provide links from various Reading suburbs and nearby towns and villages, including Newbury and Henley on Thames. Stagecoach services provide links from Basingstoke, Farnborough, Wokingham and Bracknell.

When no matches are taking place, the stadium can be reached from Reading town centre using Reading Buses Greenwave services.

The planned Green Park railway station, which will serve both the stadium and the adjacent Green Park Business Park, is set to open in early 2023. The new station will be just under a  walk from the stadium.

References
Notes

Bibliography

External links

 from Reading FC official website

Football venues in England
Sports venues in Reading, Berkshire
Premier League venues
Defunct rugby union venues in England
Rugby League World Cup stadiums
Reading F.C.
London Irish
Sports venues completed in 1998
English Football League venues
1998 establishments in England
Women's Super League venues